Príkra is a village and municipality in Svidník District in the Prešov Region of north-eastern Slovakia.

History
In historical records the village was first mentioned in 1618.

Geography

It has a population of 12 people, making it the least populated municipality in Slovakia.

References

External links
 
http://www.statistics.sk/mosmis/eng/run.html

Villages and municipalities in Svidník District
Šariš